James H. Bray (born February 12, 1954) is a psychologist and a past president of the American Psychological Association (APA). Bray is Professor and Chair of the Department of Psychology at University of Texas San Antonio.  Previously he was an associate professor in the Department of Family and Community Medicine at Baylor College of Medicine.

Career
Bray earned an undergraduate degree from the University of Houston, followed by an MA and a PhD from the same institution. Bray completed postdoctoral training in family therapy and research. He joined the faculty at Texas Woman's University (TWU) in Houston shortly thereafter.

In 1984, Bray developed the Personal Authority in the Family System Questionnaire (PAFSQ) with two other investigators. He is the Chairman of the Psychology Department at the University of Texas San Antonio.  He runs the Family and Health Laboratory.  He was the project director and principal investigator at the Baylor College of Medicine (BCM) Screening, Brief Intervention, and Referral to Treatment (SBIRT) Medical Residency Program for substance abuse. He is an associate professor emeritus at BCM. He has also completed research on the collaboration between family physicians and psychologists.

In 2009, Bray served as president of the APA after being involved in the organization's leadership for many years. Bray's presidential initiatives focused on the future of psychology practice, the state of psychological science and the psychological factors associated with homelessness. Previously, he had been president of Division 43 of the APA, the Society for Family Psychology. In addition, he served as secretary for several APA divisions and has been made a fellow of 12 APA divisions.

Works

References

Presidents of the American Psychological Association
Living people
1954 births
University of Houston alumni
Baylor College of Medicine faculty
Texas Woman's University faculty